Argelander is a lunar impact crater that is located in the south-central highlands of the Moon. It was named after the German astronomer Friedrich Argelander. It lies in the midpoint between the smaller crater Vogel in the north and the larger Airy to the south. To the northwest is the worn remnant of Parrot. Just to the west is a shallow cleft in the surface that follows a course to the north-northwest, intersecting the southeast rim of Parrot.

The rim of Argelander is somewhat worn and indented, although less distorted than Airy to the south. The bottom is relatively flat and there is a small central rise. There is a curved depression in the surface following the western rim, giving the wall a rampart on that side.

Satellite craters
By convention these features are identified on lunar maps by placing the letter on the side of the crater midpoint that is closest to Argelander.

References

External links
Argelander at The Moon Wiki

Impact craters on the Moon